Anthony McLeod known as Tony (born 29 April 1959) is a male retired British biathlete. McLeod competed in the 20 km individual event at the 1984 Winter Olympics.

His brother is Olympian Mike McLeod.

References

External links
 

1959 births
Living people
British male biathletes
Olympic biathletes of Great Britain
Biathletes at the 1984 Winter Olympics
Sportspeople from Newcastle upon Tyne